Bandon State Airport ,  is a public airport located two miles (3.2 km) southeast of the city of Bandon in Coos County, Oregon, USA. The airport has a fixed based operator, Bandon Aviation, LLC, that sells aviation gasoline and can provide major airframe and engine repairs.
 
The airport began operations in 1958, and had an average of 136 airport operations per week in the 12 months ending August 25, 2021.

References

Airports in Coos County, Oregon
1958 establishments in Oregon